Phenylethylidenehydrazine (PEH), also known as 2-phenylethylhydrazone or β-phenylethylidenehydrazine, is an inhibitor of the enzyme GABA transaminase (GABA-T). It is a metabolite of the antidepressant phenelzine and is responsible for its elevation of GABA concentrations. PEH may contribute to phenelzine's anxiolytic effects.

See also
 Phenelzine

References

Hydrazones
GABA transaminase inhibitors
Human drug metabolites